Thomas Henry Dixon (17 September 1899–unknown) was an English footballer who played in the Football League for Clapton Orient and Southend United.

References

1899 births
English footballers
Association football midfielders
English Football League players
Murton A.F.C. players
Sunderland A.F.C. players
Leyton Orient F.C. players
Southend United F.C. players
Year of death missing